The 1st constituency of Heves County is one of the single member constituencies of the National Assembly, the national legislature of Hungary. The constituency standard abbreviation: Heves 01. OEVK.

Since 2022, it has been represented by Gábor Pajtók of the Fidesz–KDNP party alliance.

Geography
The 1st constituency is located in eastern part of Heves County.

The constituency borders with 2nd constituency to the west and northwest, 6th constituency of Borsod-Abaúj-Zemplén County to the east, 3rd constituency of Jász-Nagykun-Szolnok County to the southeast and 3rd constituency to the southwest.

List of municipalities
The constituency includes the following municipalities:

History
The 1st constituency of Heves County was created in 2011 and contained of the pre-2011 abolished constituencies of 1st and  6th constituency of this County. Its borders have not changed since its creation.

Members
The constituency was first represented by Zsolt Nyitrai of the Fidesz from 2014 to 2022.  He was succeeded by Gábor Pajtók of the Fidesz in 2022.

Election result

2022 election

2018 election

2014 election

References

Heves 1st